Oldham County is a county located in the north central part of the U.S. state and commonwealth of Kentucky. As of the 2020 census, the population was 67,607. Its county seat is La Grange. The county is named for Colonel William Oldham.

Oldham County is part of the Louisville/Jefferson County, KY–IN Metropolitan Statistical Area.

Oldham County is the wealthiest county in Kentucky and 47th-wealthiest county in the U.S. and ranks as the most educated county in Kentucky  While the causes for this are complicated, areas east of Louisville have long been popular with wealthy residents, initially as summer residences and eventually as year-round suburban estates and bedroom communities. Oldham County lies northeast of the best known of these areas, Anchorage, just outside Louisville's pre-merger East End.

History
Oldham County was established on December 15, 1823 from parts of Henry, Jefferson, and Shelby Counties. It was the 74th Kentucky county, and was named in honor of Col. William Oldham of Jefferson County, a Revolutionary War officer.

Initially, it was mainly a rural county with small, scattered developments in places like Westport which was founded in 1800 and served as the county seat early on. When the Louisville and Frankfort Railroad Company introduced rail lines in the area in the 1850s, many new towns and communities sprang up. Eventually the railroad ceased operating as a form of public transportation, but the more rural nature of the county continued to draw residents away from the metropolitan areas in Jefferson County. Since the early 1970s and the completion of Interstate 71, which connects Oldham County to Downtown Louisville and shopping in Eastern Jefferson County, Oldham County has increasingly become suburban in nature, a natural extension of Louisville's wealthy East End as it ran out of large tracts of undeveloped land.

Geography
It is the 13th-smallest county in Kentucky. The county's northern border with Indiana is formed by the Ohio River.

Adjacent counties
 Clark County, Indiana (northwest)
 Trimble County (northeast)
 Henry County (east)
 Shelby County (southeast)
 Jefferson County (southwest)

Demographics

As of the census of 2000, there were 46,178 people, 14,856 households, and 12,196 families residing in the county. The racial makeup of the county was 93.62% White, 4.21% Black or African American, 0.21% Native American, 0.44% Asian, 0.01% Pacific Islander, 0.55% from other races, and 0.97% from two or more races.  1.30% of the population were Hispanic or Latino of any race.

There were 14,856 households, out of which 44.10% had children under the age of 18 living with them, 71.50% were married couples living together, 7.80% had a female householder with no husband present, and 17.90% were non-families. 14.90% of all households were made up of individuals, and 4.80% had someone living alone who was 65 years of age or older.  The average household size was 2.85 and the average family size was 3.17.

The age distribution was 27.40% under the age of 18, 6.90% from 18 to 24, 33.10% from 25 to 44, 25.60% from 45 to 64, and 7.00% who were 65 years of age or older.  The median age was 37 years. For every 100 females, there were 114.00 males.  For every 100 females age 18 and over, there were 117.90 males.

The median income for a household in the county was $70,171 (2005), and the median income for a family was $70,495. Males had a median income of $46,962 versus $28,985 for females. The per capita income for the county was $25,374.  About 2.90% of families and 4.10% of the population were below the poverty line, including 4.50% of those under age 18 and 6.00% of those age 65 or over. Oldham County is the most affluent county in the state of Kentucky; most residents work in Louisville and choose to live in Oldham County due to the lack of crime and the nationally recognized school system. North Oldham High School in particular, is ranked very highly among state high schools, having been named a national blue ribbon school of excellence, and ranked in the top 250 best schools in the nation through US Weekly.  2006 classes at Oldham County High School were reported as to have a teacher:student ratio of 1:15, but that number does not accurately reflect the ratio of a normal class.  That number includes, for example, the small classes of five to six students in Behavioral Disorders.  The published ratio also includes small classes at the County Career Center, which is located on the same campus.  The actual teacher-student ratios are closer to 1:30. Regardless of population swelling and diminishing student-teacher ratios, which have led to a slight decline as of late, Oldham county is still widely recognized as the best public school system in the state.

Communities

Cities

 Crestwood
 Goshen
 La Grange (county seat)
 Orchard Grass Hills
 Pewee Valley
 River Bluff

Census-designated places
 Buckner
 Westport

Other unincorporated places

 Ballardsville
 Brownsboro
 Centerfield
 Floydsburg
 Park Lake
 Prospect

Politics

Government
At the federal level, Oldham County overlaps two congressional districts in the House of Representatives, the third district, represented by Democrat John Yarmuth, and the fourth district, represented by Republican Thomas Massie.

Notable people
 D. W. Griffith, highly influential film director (The Birth of a Nation, Intolerance)
 Kyra Elzy, women's collegiate basketball player and coach of Kentucky Wildcats women's basketball
 Buddy Pepper, former songwriter, pianist, composer, arranger, and actor.
 Knocked Loose, a hardcore band signed to Pure Noise Records
 Justin Thomas, a Professional golfer
 Dean Kiekhefer, MLB pitcher
 Jon Rauch, MLB pitcher
 Donta Smith, professional basketball player

See also

 Louisville/Jefferson County–Elizabethtown–Madison, KY-IN Combined Statistical Area
 Moist county
 National Register of Historic Places listings in Oldham County, Kentucky
 The Oldham Era

References

External links

 
 Oldham County Chamber of Commerce

 
Kentucky counties
Kentucky counties on the Ohio River
Louisville metropolitan area
1823 establishments in Kentucky
Populated places established in 1823